Martti Saario (1906 - 1988) was a Finnish organizational theorist and Professor of Accounting at the Helsinki School of Economics, known for his development of the Finnish expenditure-revenue theory.

Saario obtained his PhD at the Helsinki School of Economics in 1945 with a thesis on the "Realisointiperiaate ja käyttöomaisuuden poistot tuloslaskennassa" (depreciation of fixed assets and annual income measurement). He served as Professor of Accounting at the Helsinki School from 1948 until his retirement in 1971. While he focussed on financial accounting (bookkeeping, company income taxation, auditing), a second Professor of accounting Henrik Virkkunen focussed on management accounting.

Saario developed an expenditure-revenue theory, which offered "a dynamic profit calculation theory of accounting... [which] strongly influenced Finnish accounting thought, legislation, and practice until the mid-1990s."

Selected publications 
 Saario, Martti. Realisointiperiaate ja käyttöomaisuuden poistot tuloslaskennassa. PhD Thesis, Helsinki School of Economics, 1945.
 Saario, Martti. Kirjanpidon meno-tulo-teoria. Otava, 1959.

Articles, a selection:
 Saario, Martti. "On Expenditure Tax Shield." Enterprise Income, Financing and Taxation II (in Finnish). Ed. by Martti Saario. Helsinki (1969).
 Saario, Martti. "The Present Value and Proper Timing of Depreciations." Enterprise Income, Financing and Taxation II (in Finnish). Ed. by Martti Saario. Helsinki (1969).

About Saario:
 Pihlanto, Pekka, and Kari Lukka. "Martti Saario–suomalaisen laskenta-ajattelun kehittäjä." The Finnish Journal of Business Economics 3 (1993): 251–277.
 Lukka, K., and P. Pihlanto. "Martti Saario (1906–88). The developer of Finnish accounting theory." Twentieth-century accounting thinkers. Routledge (1994).
 Pajunen, Kati. "Martti saario–Henkilökuva." LTA 4 (2011): 11.

References

1906 births
1988 deaths
Finnish business theorists
Accounting academics
Aalto University alumni
Academic staff of Aalto University